The Miss Tall International pageant selects a representative of Tall Clubs International. The annual event includes contestants from across the United States and Canada, and takes place during the Tall Clubs International annual convention.

Competition
Throughout the year, all individual local clubs have the opportunity to select representatives. Member clubs may choose a representative in any way their club bylaws provide, typically by way of a local pageant or election. Winners of local pageants may attend the annual Tall Clubs International convention and compete on a national level to be the representative, globally, of all TCI member clubs as Miss Tall International.

Miss Tall International is considered by TCI to be a goodwill ambassador to the world to get the tall message out on a national and international level. Expenses for Miss TI's travels are paid by inviting clubs, with some reimbursement by the TCI Executive Board.

The winner often visits member clubs at their annual weekend upon invitation. During her travels, she may often be booked for publicity sessions organized by the hosting club. Miss TI has appeared in the past on nationally televised TV shows, radio shows, and other high-profile events. She may also use her position to instigate changes in the industry to provide a higher quality of life for tall people.

History
The earliest recorded tall pageant winner was in 1947, when four tall clubs around the US sent contestants. The title was changed in 1967 to "Miss Tall Universe" and was changed again in 1974 to "Miss Tall International". In general, contestants can win local club titles many times, can compete for Miss TI as frequently as their clubs will send them, and can win the title of Miss TI only once. The number of contestants in the annual competition has varied widely, from two contestants in some years to 23 contestants in 1993. In 1991, the competition lasted over 4 hours with 21 contestants.

Winners

References

External links 
Tall Clubs International website
Gallery of Tall Queens

Beauty pageants in the United States
1947 establishments in the United States